Christianson is a patronymic surname and an anglicized form of the Danish/Norwegian Christiansen.

Christianson, as a person, may refer to:
Adolph M. Christianson (1877 – 1954), Norwegian-born former Chief Justice of the North Dakota Supreme Court
Donna Jean Christianson (1931-2015), American politician
John Christianson (1923 – 2010), Canadian politician and cabinet member
Ken Christianson, American musician and composer; younger brother of Masanori Christianson
Kipp Christianson, professional wrestler best known as Eli Cottonwood formerly from WWE's NXT
Marc and Betty Christianson, American founders of the Dakota Zoo 
Marvin E. Christianson Sr. (1928-1969), American politician
Masanori Mark Christianson (born 1976), Japanese born American musician and older brother of Ken Christianson
Oliver Christianson, also known as Revilo ("Oliver" spelled backwards), American cartoonist, greeting card designer, and illustrator
Stanley R. Christianson (1925 – 1950), United States Marine Corps Korean War posthumous Medal of Honor recipient
Theodore Christianson (1883 – 1948), American politician; Governor of Minnesota and later U.S. Representative for Minnesota
Theodore Christianson (judge) (1913-1955), American jurist; Minnesota Supreme Court justice
Wei Christianson (born 1956), Chinese-born CEO of Morgan Stanley China and Co-CEO of Morgan Stanley Asia
William C. Christianson (1892-1985), American jurist; Minnesota Supreme Court justice

See also
Christensen
Christiansen
Kristiansen
Justice Christianson (disambiguation)

Patronymic surnames
Surnames from given names